Abhimanyu is a 2006 Indian Bengali language action drama film directed by Swapan Saha, starring Mithun Chakraborty, Tapas Paul, Rajatava Dutta and Debashree Roy. The film was again in the news, as actor Mithun Chakraborty went on to recite some of his most famous one-liners of the film, when he officially joined BJP.

Plot
Durjoy Ray is a terrorist leader who has links with Kamal Pasha, another leader across the border. One of Durjoy Ray's commanders, Raghab Ray is caught by Inspector Raj Sinha. Many terrorists are killed in the encounter. To take revenge, Durjoy Ray's team members kill all the members of Raj Sinha's family, barring Nandini - Raj's sister-in-law, and her daughter Rimi. Raj gets the news that terrorists may again attack his family. Nandini and Rimi are not in the house and are thus safe. Raj learns that his long-lost friend Abhimanyu Nag is still alive. Abhimanyu is a very capable officer of the crime branch, but when he fails to overpower a group of terrorists who were trying to cross the border because he failed to give the "pipe" order, he is suspended permanently from his job. He is accused of having links with the terrorists. The truth, however, is that Abhimanyu's wife and daughter were being held at gunpoint at that time, making Abhimanyu completely helpless. Raj appoints Abhimanyu the bodyguard of Nandini and Rimi. Though initially reclusive, Abhimanyu strikes a friendship with Rimi and also with her mother Nannui. But Rimi is kidnapped one day and Abhimanyu is left wounded and hospitalised. Bikram Sen blames Abhimanyu for this event. Terrorists want Raghab Ray in exchange for Rimi. Abhimanyu learns of Bikram Sen's deal with Durjoy Ray in exchange of Raghab Ray for Rimi. He kills Bikram. Rimi escapes with help from a terrorist, but is again caught. Raj Sinha locates the place where Durjoy Ray and the released terrorist Raghab are hiding. Police carry out raids. Abhimanyu kills Raghab and Durjay but finally he himself succumbs to fatal wounds.

Cast
 Mithun Chakraborty as Abhimanyu Nag, Officer At Crime Branch
 Joy Badlani as Mustafa, Crime head and right-hand of Durjoy Ray
 Biswajit Chakraborty as Bikram Sen, Police Minister
 Locket Chatterjee as Abhimanyu's Wife
 Sumit Ganguly as Raghav Ray/ Bunty Suleyman
 Oindrila Sen as Rimi
 Tapas Paul as Raj Sinha
 Rajatava Dutta as Durjoy Ray, Terrorist Leader
 Debashree Roy as Nandini
 Anu Choudhury as Titli
 Piya Sengupta as Manashi Sinha, Raj Sinha's wife
 Raja Chattopadhyay as Sumit Sinha, Rimi's father
 Jisshu Sengupta as Ajit Ghosh, Police Inspector
 Dulal Lahiri as ACP Crime Branch

Crew
Poster designer - Goutam Barat 
Production designer - Indranil Ghosh

References

External links
 

2006 films
Bengali-language Indian films
2000s Bengali-language films
Films directed by Swapan Saha
Indian action drama films